Harold Clark Pegg (September 10, 1915 – November 28, 1991), who preferred to be called "Hal" or "Mike", was an American football center who played for the Buffalo Indians of the American Football League in 1940.  He played college football at Bucknell and was drafted by the Philadelphia Eagles of the National Football League (NFL) in the seventh round of the 1940 NFL Draft.  He played in seven games in 1940 for the Indians, starting five.

References

External links

1915 births
1991 deaths
American football centers
Bucknell Bison football players
Buffalo Indians players
People from Dundalk, Maryland